The Indian National Basketball League (INBL) is the open-entry franchise basketball league in India, organized and run by the Basketball Federation of India (BFI).

History 
The league's organizer has been Headstart Arena India, a Punjab-based recreational, cultural and sporting activities company which also has business interests in Australia. They have been granted a five-year license by the BFI to run the competition and also help promote the 3x3 version of the game.

K. Govindaraj, BFI president, said the INBL's aim was to provide players with additional competitive games to improve their standards towards the Elite Pro Basketball League and look to qualify for competitions such as the Olympics and World Cups.

The inaugural season was held in 2022 across three rounds in three different cities, namely Kochi, Pune and Delhi. The Chennai Heat won the first-ever INBL championship after defeating the Bengaluru Kings in the finals, that were hosted in the Kanteerava Indoor Stadium in Bengaluru.

Results

List of finals

Awards

Most Valuable Player

See also 
 UBA Pro Basketball League
 3BL
 National Basketball Championship
 West Asia Super League
 Basketball in India
 Sports in India

References

2021 establishments in India
Basketball competitions in India
India
Professional sports leagues in India
Sports leagues established in 2021